Joannette Kruger and Francesca Schiavone were the defending champions, but did not compete this year.

Svetlana Kuznetsova and Arantxa Sánchez Vicario won the title by defeating Evgenia Kulikovskaya and Ekaterina Sysoeva 6–2, 6–2 in the final.

Seeds
Champion seeds are indicated in bold text while text in italics indicates the round in which those seeds were eliminated.

Draw

Draw

References
 Main and Qualifying Draws

Women's Doubles
2002 WTA Tour